is a Japanese actor and musician.

Career
Yosuke Kubozuka has been a model for many magazines and TV commercials before starting out his acting career where he debuted in a 1995 TV crime drama Kindaichi Case Files. In 1998, he starred in the TV series GTO as the role of an honors student, Yoshito Kikuchi. In 2000, he starred in Ikebukuro West Gate Park along with Tomoya Nagase, Ken Watanabe (The Last Samurai, Memoirs of a Geisha, Inception) and Tomohisa Yamashita (Nobuta wo Produce, Kurosagi, Operation Love, Code Blue). In this drama he starring as the role of "King" of the G-Boys, Takashi Ando.

In 2001, he starred in Strawberry on the Shortcake along with other popular young artists such as Hideaki Takizawa and Kyoko Fukada. In the drama he took the role of being Kyoko Fukada's first love.

in October of that same year, Go (directed by Isao Yukisada), which tells the story of a Zainichi chosenjin teenager, who falls in love with a Japanese girl. was officially released. For his performance in this role, Kubozuka took home two awards (Outstanding Performance by an Actor in a Leading Role and Newcomer of the Year) at Japan Academy Film Prize. Kubozuka also appeared in Mr. Children's 2002 "Kimi ga Suki" music video, which won MTV Video Music Award Japan for Video of the Year in 2002 (Mr. Children also nominated in Best Group Category but losing to Backstreet Boys).

Since then, Kubozuka took on projects starring in Ping Pong, Kyoki no Sakura as well as Samurai Resurrection.

He also appeared in films such as Tokyo Island, Monsters Club, Helter Skelter, and the 2016 remake of Silence directed by Martin Scorsese.

Kubozuka has also been pursuing his career as a reggae musician by the name 'Manji Line' (卍 LINE) since 2006.

Personal life
Kubozuka graduated from Kanagawa Prefectural Yokosuka High School. He married in May 2003 and had one son. In 2004, he survived after falling 26 metres from his 9th floor apartment. On July 12, 2012, Kubozuka announced through his official website that he had divorced his wife a month earlier. Kubozuka has official custody of his son. Kubozuka remarried in December 2015, a daughter was born in 2017.

Filmography

Movie

Television

Stage Play

Awards and nominations

Awards
 25th Television Academy Awards: Best Supporting Actor for Ikebukuro West Gate Park
 28th Television Academy Awards: Best Supporting Actor for Strawberry on the Shortcake
 2002: 25th Japan Academy Film Prize: Best Actor & Newcomer of the Year for Go!
 2001: Hochi Film Awards: Best Actor for Go!
 2001: Nikkan Sports Film Awards: Ishihara Yujiro New Actor Award for Go!
 2002: Kinema Junpo Awards: Best Actor for Go! & Oboreru Sakana, Best New Actor for Go!
 2002: Mainichi Film Concurs: Sponichi Grand Prize New Talent Award
 2002: Marrakech International Film Festival: Best Actor for Go!
 2002: Yokohama Film Festival: Best Actor for Go! & Oboreru Sakana
2017: Parenting Award：Best Father Category

References

External links

 
 
 Manji Line in Twitter

1979 births
Living people
Japanese male film actors
Japanese male television actors
Japanese reggae singers
People from Yokosuka, Kanagawa
20th-century Japanese male actors
21st-century Japanese male actors
21st-century Japanese male singers
21st-century Japanese singers